Baharestan, (in Persian: بهارستان), (pronounced as Bahārestān or Bahaarestaan) (meaning the land of spring, the spring orchard or the spring garden), is a Persian book written by Jami that contains prose. It has stories, tales and moral advice mainly in prose, but also in poetry. Baharestan is divided into eight chapters, an introduction, and a final part. Each of its chapters is called a rowzeh (from Arabic rawzah, meaning paradise or heaven). Jami wrote this book in a year in the 9th century after Muhammad's departure to Medina. In the introduction of Baharestan, Jami stated that he had written this book in the style of Saadi Shirazi's Gulistan for his son who was ten years old at the time and was studying. Baharestan has content about Sufism and mysticism. There are 469 verses of poetry in this book; 16 verses being in Arabic and the rest in Persian. Baharestan has saj' in its texts and the type of its prose is rhymed prose; i.e. it is rhythmic. Each chapter in Baharestan has a specific topic; for example, in the seventh chapter, the topic is the life and the biography of some poets.

References 
 Persian Wikipedia Contributors. بهارستان (کتاب). Persian. 19 September 2016; 15:47 (UTC). Translated to English from Persian by the creator of the page.
 The World of Persian Literary Humanism.
 ..
 Sweet short stories from Jami's Baharestan - About This Book. Permanent archived link.
 . Permanent archived link.
 . Alternative link.
 SID.ir | AN INVESTIGATION ON THE SOURCES OF THE ANECDOTES FROM THE FIRST CHAPTER OF JAMI’S BAHARESTAN. Permanent link.
 Britannica Guide to the Islamic World.
 The Great Poet Jami - The New Nation. Permanent archived link.
 بهارستان جامی. (Persian). Permanent archived link (alternative link with the date).
 BAHĀRESTĀN (1) – Encyclopaedia Iranica
 Binary Oppositions in Baharestan by Jami - Tarbiat Modares University Journals System

15th-century books
Iranian books
Persian-language books
Sufi literature